The Exchange Club is an historic structure located at 815 4th Avenue in the Gaslamp Quarter, San Diego, in the U.S. state of California. It was built in 1905.

See also
 List of Gaslamp Quarter historic buildings

References

External links

 

1905 establishments in California
Buildings and structures completed in 1905
Buildings and structures in San Diego
Gaslamp Quarter, San Diego